RFA Tidespring (A75) was a   of the Royal Fleet Auxiliary. As a replenishment oiler, her main purpose was to refuel other ships. The ship had a long career in the RFA, entering service in the early 1960s, and finally being decommissioned in 1991.

Tidespring took part in the Falklands War, particularly in the recapture of South Georgia. At the time, she was carrying M Company of 42 Commando Royal Marines. The ship accommodated prisoners of war taken during operations. The Falklands provided a reprieve of ten years for Tidespring which had been due to decommission in 1982.

She eventually sailed from Portsmouth in tow on 20 March 1992 for the breakers, arriving in Alang, India, for demolition on 2 July 1992.

References

Tide-class replenishment oilers
Falklands War naval ships of the United Kingdom
Falklands War in South Georgia
1962 ships